Sarwanand Koul Premi, also spelled Sarvanand Kaul Premi (2 November 1924 – 1 May 1990), was a Kashmiri poet, journalist, research scholar, Gandhian, social reformer and independence activist living in Jammu & Kashmir, India. Along with his young married son, Verinder (27), he was kidnapped and executed by Islamic terrorists in 1990.

Early life and education 
Sarwanand was the son of Gopi Nath Koul and Omravati Koul, who were members of the Kashmiri Pandit family of Soaf-Shali (ancient Sanskrit name: Supt-Shaleshwar) village in Kashmir's Anantnag district. They were a farming family and used to live in the village of Sof-Shali, near the Kokarnag tourist area in the Anantnag District of Kashmir. Premi's father was the first matriculate to receive further education.

After his initial schooling, Premi was admitted to mission High School in Anantnag where from he passed his Matriculation in 1939 and enrolled in Punjab University, Lahore. Later, he obtained his B.A. and Hon's in Hindi(Prabhakar) from Punjab University, M.A. and B.Ed. degrees from Jammu and Kashmir University. From 1942 to 1946, he worked underground for the Quit India Movement and was arrested six times during this period.

For a few years he worked for the Village and the Khadi Industries Board (a state enterprise) as well as the Industries Department of Punjab. He returned to Kashmir and joined the education department of Jammu and Kashmir as a teacher from 1954 to 1977.

Published work 

 Kalami Premi 
 Payami Premi 
 Rood Jeri 
 Osh ta Vush 
 Gitanjanli (Translations) 
 Russi Padshah Katha 
 Panctchadar (poetic collections) 
 Bakhti Koosum 
 Akhri Mulaqat 
 Mathur Devi 
 MIrza Kak (life and works) 
 Mirza Kak Ji Wakhs 
 Kashmiri ki beeti 
 Bagwat Gita (Translations 1) 
 Taj 
 Rupa Bhawani

Death

He along with his son was murdered and hanged by Kashmiri Islamic separatist militants on 1 May 1990.

References

1924 births
1990 deaths
1990 murders in India
20th-century poets
Activists from Jammu and Kashmir
Kashmiri poets
Kashmiri writers
People murdered in Jammu and Kashmir
University of the Punjab alumni
Deaths by hanging